Morchella rigidoides is a species of fungus in the family Morchellaceae. Described as new to science in 1966 by Roger Heim, it is found in Papua New Guinea.

References

External links

rigidoides
Edible fungi
Fungi described in 1966
Fungi of New Guinea